Wumi Toriola is Nigerian film actress and film producer.

Early life and education 
Wumi Toriola was born in Lagos, Nigeria. She attended Providence Primary and Secondary School in Lagos State before she later proceeded to University of Ilorin where she obtained a Bachelor's degree in Linguistics.

Career 
In 2009, Toriola got her first acting role in the movie titled Odunfa Caucus, and produced her first movie titled Ajewunmi in 2015.

In 2018, she won the Fastest Rising Actress (Yoruba) award at the City People Entertainment Awards.

Personal life
Toriola got married in 2018. She gave birth to her first child on 14 October 2019. 

In 2023, she announced via her Instagram page that her marriage of four years had crashed

Filmography

Actor
 Alakada Reloaded
 Ayomipo
 Wedding Ring
 Our Love Story
 False Flag (film)

Producer
 Obinrin
  Ajewunmi
 My Past
 Ayo Ife
 Sugbon Kan
 Omo Better

Awards and nominations

See also
 List of Nigerian film producers
List of Yoruba people

References 

Living people
Year of birth missing (living people)
Yoruba actresses
Nigerian film actresses
Nigerian film award winners
Actresses in Yoruba cinema
People from Lagos State
University of Ilorin alumni
Nigerian film producers
21st-century Nigerian actresses
Nigerian women film producers